Break Point is a documentary series produced in a collaboration between Netflix, Association of Tennis Professionals (ATP), and Women's Tennis Association (WTA) to give a behind-the-scenes look at the players and tournaments of the ATP Tour and WTA Tour.

The first part consisting of five episodes and focusing on the Australian Open, Indian Wells Masters, Madrid Open, and French Open was released on 13 January 2023, while the second part consisting of five episodes and focusing on Wimbledon, Eastbourne International, Queen's Club, U.S. Open, WTA Finals, and ATP Finals will be released in June 2023.

In March 2023, the series was renewed for a second season.

Cast

ATP Tour 
 Félix Auger-Aliassime
 Matteo Berrettini
 Taylor Fritz
 Thanasi Kokkinakis
 Nick Kyrgios
 Casper Ruud

WTA Tour 
 Paula Badosa
 Ons Jabeur
 Maria Sakkari
 Ajla Tomljanovic

Episodes

Production 
In January 2022, Netflix ordered a documentary series of a behind-the-scenes look at the men’s and women’s professional tennis players throughout the four Grand Slam tournaments. It is produced by Box to Box Films, who produced the Formula One documentary series Formula 1: Drive to Survive, with James Gay-Rees and Paul Martin as executive producers. In December 2022, Netflix announced that the series would be titled Break Point and would feature Félix Auger-Aliassime, Paula Badosa, Matteo Berrettini, Taylor Fritz, Ons Jabeur, Thanasi Kokkinakis, Nick Kyrgios, Casper Ruud, Aryna Sabalenka, Maria Sakkari, Sloane Stephens, Iga Świątek, Frances Tiafoe, Ajla Tomljanovic, and Stefanos Tsitsipas. On 7 March 2023, Netflix renewed the series for a second season.

Reception

Critical response 
For the first season, the review aggregator website Rotten Tomatoes reported a 79% approval rating with an average rating of 6.3/10 based on 14 reviews. Metacritic, which uses a weighted average, assigned a score of 74 out of 100 for the season, based on reviews from 6 critics, indicating "generally favorable reviews".

References

External links 

 
 

2020s British documentary television series
2022 in tennis
2023 British television series debuts
Documentary television series about sports
English-language Netflix original programming
Netflix original documentary television series
Tennis mass media
ATP Tour
WTA Tour